Byron Township is a civil township of Kent County in the U.S. state of Michigan. The population was 20,317 at the 2010 census, an increase from 17,553 at the 2000 census.

Byron Township is part of the Grand Rapids metropolitan area and is located just southwest of the city of Grand Rapids.

Communities
 Byron Center is an unincorporated community and census-designated place at the center of the township. The Byron Center 49315 ZIP Code serves most of the township.
Carlisle was a station on the Grand Rapids and Indiana Railroad. A post office named "West Carlisle" operated here from March 1884 until September 1910.
 Corinth is an unincorporated community in the southeast part of the township on the boundary with Gaines Township.
 Cutlerville is an unincorporated community and census-designated place in the northeast of the township, with part of the CDP extending east into Gaines Township.
It began as a settlement named "Scudderville" on Rush Creek with a station on the Lake Shore and Michigan Southern Railway. It was named for Henry W. Scudder, a local landowner. A post office named "North Byron" operated from October 1862 to December 1879 and from March 1894 to September 1903.
 North Dorr is a small community at the boundary between Byron Township and Dorr Township in Allegan County to the south.
Ross began as a depot on the Grand Rapids and Indiana Railroad and was first named "Ross Station". It was platted by William Thornton for William Ross in 1871. A post office was established in June 1871 with Daniel Ross as the first postmaster.

History
Byron Township was established in 1836.

Geography

Major highways
 runs south–north near the eastern edge of the township.
 runs west–east near the northern edge of the township and has an interchange with U.S. Route 131.

Demographics
As of the census of 2000, there were 17,553 people, 6,454 households, and 4,711 families residing in the township. The racial makeup of the township was 94.79% White, 1.21% African American, 0.32% Native American, 1.06% Asian, 0.02% Pacific Islander, 1.17% from other races, and 1.42% from two or more races. Hispanic or Latino of any race were 2.77% of the population.

There were 6,454 households, out of which 36.4% had children under the age of 18 living with them, 61.2% were married couples living together, 8.5% had a female householder with no husband present, and 27.0% were non-families. 21.3% of all households were made up of individuals, and 6.6% had someone living alone who was 65 years of age or older.  The average household size was 2.71 and the average family size was 3.18.

In the township the population was spread out, with 29.0% under the age of 18, 9.0% from 18 to 24, 30.2% from 25 to 44, 20.9% from 45 to 64, and 10.9% who were 65 years of age or older.  The median age was 34 years. For every 100 females, there were 100.0 males.  For every 100 females age 18 and over, there were 96.7 males.

The median income for a household in the township was $49,672, and the median income for a family was $56,701. Males had a median income of $42,664 versus $26,449 for females. The per capita income for the township was $24,206.  About 2.5% of families and 4.1% of the population were below the poverty line, including 4.4% of those under age 18 and 4.0% of those age 65 or over.

Economy
Michigan grocery distributor and retail operator SpartanNash (formerly known as Spartan Stores) is headquartered in the township.

Education
Byron Township is served by four different public school districts.  The majority of the township is served by Byron Center Public Schools, while a small portion of the northeast corner in Cutlerville is served by Kentwood Public Schools.  A very small portion of the northern edge of the township is served by Grandville Public Schools, and another very small portion on the southern edge of the township is served by Wayland Union Schools.

References

External links
Byron Township official website

Townships in Michigan
Townships in Kent County, Michigan
Grand Rapids metropolitan area
Populated places established in 1836
1836 establishments in Michigan Territory